Raylee is a given name. Notable people with the name include:

Raylee (singer), Norwegian singer who took part in Melodi Grand Prix 2021
Raylee Johnson (born 1970), American football player

See also
Rayleen